Greater Latrobe School District is a midsized, suburban public school district in Westmoreland County, Pennsylvania. The city of Latrobe and the borough of Youngstown as well as Unity Township are within district boundaries. The community is a mix of Pittsburgh suburbia and rural areas.

According to 2005 local census data, it served a resident population of 29,134 people. In 2009, the district residents’ per capita income was $20,168, while the median family income was $47,069. In the Commonwealth of Pennsylvania, the median family income was $49,501 and the United States median family income was $49,445, in 2010.

The district operates three elementary schools, one junior high school, and one senior high school. Students at the Senior High have the opportunity to attend the Eastern Westmoreland Career and Technology Center in Derry Township.

Extracurriculars
The district offers a variety of clubs, activities and sports.

Athletics

References

External links
 Greater Latrobe School District
 Pennsylvania Inter-Scholastic Athletic Assn.

School districts in Westmoreland County, Pennsylvania
Education in Pittsburgh area
Latrobe, Pennsylvania